The Cholecystokinin A receptor is a human protein, also known as CCKAR or CCK1, with CCK1 now being the IUPHAR-recommended name.

Function 

This gene encodes a G-protein coupled receptor that binds sulfated members of the cholecystokinin (CCK) family of peptide hormones. This receptor is a major physiologic mediator of pancreatic enzyme secretion and smooth muscle contraction of the gallbladder and stomach. In the central and peripheral nervous system this receptor regulates satiety and the release of beta-endorphin and dopamine.

The extracellular, N-terminal, domain of this protein adopts a tertiary structure consisting of a few helical turns and a disulfide-cross linked loop. It is required for interaction of the cholecystokinin A receptor with its corresponding hormonal ligand.

Selective Ligands

Agonists
 Cholecystokinin
 CCK-4
 SR-146,131
 A-71623 - modified tetrapeptide, potent and selective CCKA agonist, IC50 3.7nM, 1200x selectivity over CCKB, CAS# 130408-77-4

Antagonists
 Proglumide
 Lorglumide
 Devazepide
 Dexloxiglumide
 Asperlicin
 SR-27897
 IQM-95333
 JNJ-17156516

See also 
 Cholecystokinin receptor
 Cholecystokinin antagonist

References

External links

Further reading 

 
 
 
 
 
 
 
 
 
 
 
 
 
 
 
 
 
 
 
 

G protein-coupled receptors
Protein domains
Cholecystokinin receptors